Thérèse Peltier (1873 – 1926), born Thérèse Juliette Cochet, was a French sculptor and early aviation pioneer. Popularly believed to have been the first ever female passenger in an airplane, she may also have been the first woman to pilot an aircraft. A friend of fellow sculptor Leon Delagrange, when he became interested in aviation Peltier soon followed.

Early life and career
Thérèse Peltier was born the daughter of a liquor distiller on September 26, 1873, in Orléans Loiret, France. In 1893, she married Marine doctor Alfred Peltier of Paris, where she would reside for most of her life. Peltier began to take sculpture lessons and exhibit in numerous salons. In 1908 she received the sculpture prize from the Union of Women Painters and Sculptors, which was the first society of female artists in France. Peltier specialized in wax sculpture and was included along with Delagrange and a group of other wax sculptors in a 1902 profile in The Literary Digest.

Aviation
On 8 July 1908 in Turin, Peltier flew as a passenger with Delagrange for a distance of 200 metres (656 feet). She is widely believed to have been the first female passenger on an airplane; however Henri Farman is reported to have flown or tried to fly with a Mlle P. Van Pottelsberghe in Ghent, Belgium in late May. Delagrange taught Peltier how to fly his Voisin 1907 biplane and she completed a number of solo flights, although she never earned her pilot's license. After a few training sessions, she flew alone for the first time in Issy-le-Moulineaux. The feat was recounted in L'Aérophile:

Also in 1908, Peltier accompanied Delagrange on his successful record attempt for flight duration, during which he flew 30 minutes and 28 seconds. She also joined him on a series of Italian flight exhibitions in Turin and Rome, which she reported on for the French newspapers. During this tour, she made a solo flight of 200 metres at a height of 2.5 metres (7 feet) at the Military Square in Turin. The date of this flight is unknown, but it was reported in the weekly Italian magazine L'Illustrazione Italiana as 27 September 1908.

In late 1908, Delagrange offered a prize of 100 francs for the first woman aviator to pilot a plane for one kilometer. Peltier reportedly began training to compete for the prize, but when Delagrange died in an airplane accident, on 4 January 1910 at Bordeaux, she left aviation forever. She wrote to Henri Deutsch-de-la Meurthe:

Death
Peltier died in Paris on February 18, 1926.

See also
Marie Marvingt

References 

French aviators
Aviation pioneers
1873 births
1926 deaths
20th-century French sculptors
20th-century French women artists
French women aviators